Regina Relang (1906–1989) was a German fashion photographer and photojournalist active in the 1950s and 1960s. She documented the latest designs of prominent fashion houses.

Biography 
Relang (born Regina Lang) was born in Stuttgart in 1906, daughter of painter Paul Lang and textile designer Minna Lang-Kurz. Her younger sister was the jewelry designer Anni Schaad. Relang studied painting at the Kunstakademie Stuttgart and the Academy of Arts, Berlin. Her introduction to the world of fashion came after she befriended fashion photographer Willy Maywald and moved to Paris.

Relang began working for Vogue in 1938, publishing photographs in the French, American, and British editions. Her work was also regularly used in Die Dame, Madame (magazine), Harper's Bazaar, Film und Frau, and Constanze. Over the course of her career, she photographed the women's fashion of Christian Dior, Pierre Cardin, and Yves Saint-Laurent and reported on haute couture shows from Paris and Rome. Her photographs are known for their elegance, glamour, and use of lifelike settings that contrast with the designs being showcased. Models photographed by Relang include Jean Patchett, Linda Morand, Ina Balke, Isa Stoppi, Elsa Martinelli, Simone D'Aillencourt, and Suzy Parker.

Relang was awarded the Federal Cross of Merit in 1972 and the David Octavius Hill Medal in 1973. She died in Munich in 1989.

Collections 
Munich Stadtmuseum
Ludwiggalerie Schloss Oberhausen
Getty Museum
Historisches Museum (Frankfurt)

Recent exhibitions 
Lo Sguardo Italiano: Fashion photographs from 1951 to today, Fondazione Pitti Discovery, 2005
Vanity, National Museum, Kraków, 2013
Rich Pickings: Displaying Wealth, Museum für Kunst und Gewerbe Hamburg, 2014
Who's Afraid of Women Photographers, Musée d'Orsay, 2015
Silk gowns and leather jackets: The fashion studio of Erika Segel-Reinhardt, Historical Museum, Frankfurt, 2015
Regina Relang: Staging Elegance: Fashion and photojournalism from 1930 to 1980, Ludwiggalerie Schloss Oberhausen, 2016
The Invention of Press Photography: From the Ullstein Collection 1894–1945, Deutsches Historisches Museum, 2017

Publications 
The Elegant World of Regina Relang. Berlin: Hatje Cantz, 2005. , 296 pages, German and English.

References

External links 
Selection of photographs by Relang on Artnet

1906 births
1989 deaths
Artists from Stuttgart
20th-century photographers
Fashion photographers
German women photographers
Recipients of the Cross of the Order of Merit of the Federal Republic of Germany
20th-century women photographers